Wilkos is a surname. Notable people with the surname include: 

Katarzyna Wilkos (born 1993), Polish cyclist
Rachelle Wilkos (born 1971), American television producer
Steve Wilkos (born 1964), American television personality

See also
Wilkes (surname)
Wilks